Naveces is one of eight parishes (administrative divisions) in Castrillón, a municipality within the province and autonomous community of Asturias, in northern Spain.

The population is 570(INE 2011).

References

Parishes in Castrillón